The 2017 MLS Re-Entry Draft took place on December 15, 2017 (Stage 1) and December 21, 2017 (Stage 2). All 23 Major League Soccer clubs were eligible to participate. The priority order for the MLS Re-Entry Draft was reverse order of finish in 2017, taking into account playoff performance. The 2018 expansion team, Los Angeles FC, had selection 23.

Available to all teams in Stage 1 of the Re-Entry draft were:
 Players not eligible for free agency who were at least 23 years old in 2017 with a minimum of three years of MLS experience.
 Players not eligible for free agency who did not receive a bona fide offer and who were at least 25 years old with a minimum of four years of MLS experience, or were at least 30 years old with a minimum of eight years of MLS experience.

Players who were not selected in Stage 1 of the Re-Entry Draft were made available in Stage 2. Clubs selecting players in Stage 2 were able to negotiate a new salary with the player. Players who remained unselected after Stage 2 were made available to any MLS club on a first-come, first-served basis.

Teams also had the option of passing on their selection.

Available players
Players were required to meet age and service requirements to participate as stipulated by the terms of the MLS Collective Bargaining Agreement. The league released a list of all players available for the Re-Entry Draft on December 14, 2017.

Stage One
The first stage of the 2017 MLS Re-Entry Draft took place on December 15, 2017.

Round 1

Round 2

Stage Two
The second stage of the 2017 MLS Re-Entry Draft took place on December 21, 2017.

Round 1

Round 2

References

Categories 

Major League Soccer drafts
Mls Re-entry Draft, 2017
MLS Re-Entry Draft